Amalfi – Sarah Brightman Love Songs (2009) is a compilation album by English soprano Sarah Brightman; it was released in conjunction with the Japanese film Amalfi: Rewards of the Goddess. This movie features an appearance and performance by Brightman, and is a special production marking Fuji Television's 50th anniversary. This is the first Japanese movie to be shot entirely on location in Italy. With tracks selected by Brightman, the album contains new photos/artwork and was released on July 8, 2009 exclusively in Japan. It was Japan's best-selling classical album of 2009 and won at the 24th Japan Gold Disc Awards under the category of Top Classical Album of the Year.

Track listing 

Time to Say Goodbye (solo version) – from Classics
La Wally – from Timeless
Il Mio Cuore Va – from Eden
O Mio Babbino Caro – from Classics
Anytime, Anywhere – from Eden
Attesa – from Symphony
Lascia ch'io pianga – from Eden
Nella Fantasia – from Eden
La Luna – from La Luna
Solo Con Te – from La Luna
Ave Maria – from Classics
Until The End Of Time – from Harem
Storia D’Amore – from Symphony
Jesu, Joy of Man's Desiring – from A Winter Symphony
La Califfa – from La Luna
Serenade – from La Luna
How Fair This Place – from La Luna
Amazing Grace – from A Winter Symphony
Nessun Dorma – from Eden

Charts
Amalfi debuted in the top 30 in Japan. It entered the chart at #25 and landed at #24 in the second week. In the third week on chart the album peaked at #11 selling 10,488 copies.

Weekly charts

Certifications

References

External links

2009 compilation albums
Sarah Brightman albums